Allianz Parque, also known as Palestra Itália Arena, is a multipurpose stadium in São Paulo, Brazil, built to receive shows, concerts, corporate events, and especially football matches of Palmeiras, the site owner. The stadium has a capacity of 43,713 spectators. At the time of its opening, the stadium had one of the most modern multipurpose spaces in the whole country. Its stadium meets all of FIFA's standards, accrediting it to receive the most relevant sports tournaments. Its construction started in 2010 under the authorship of Portuguese architect Tomás Taveira. The stadium was built by the company WTorre Properties/Arenas, belonging to WTorre Group. The stadium is located on the site previously occupied by Palestra Itália Stadium, also popularly known as Parque Antárctica, and opened in 2014.

Location 
The stadium is located in Pompeia Village, nearby the neighbourhoods of Perdizes and Barra Funda, in the west zone of São Paulo city. Near to the stadium, there is the Palmeiras–Barra Funda Metro Station at 1.5 km of distance, the Água Branca Metropolitan Train Station and several bus lines, totaling 50 different routes.

For drivers, parking service is adjacent to the Allianz Parque, with capacity for 2,000 cars, plus 4,800 parking spaces in two malls located nearby. The complex is situated only 4 km from Paulista Avenue and 5 km from Central Zone of São Paulo. Besides, there are 9 5-star hotels in a radius of 6 km, more than 8,000 hospitalar beds at a distance of 5 km, apart from Congonhas Airport and Guarulhos Airport, at 13 and 30 km of distance, respectively.

History

Background

Agreement 

The transformation of the former Palestra Italia Stadium in arena is the result of an agreement signed between Palmeiras and the company WTorre Properties/Arenas, belonging to WTorre Group. WTorre will manage the site for 30 years, and Palmeiras will profit 100% with the ticket sales at football matches.

According to the agreement between Palmeiras and WTorre, all expenses for the use of the arena, such as water, electricity, security, cleaning, insurance, lawn maintenance, shall be borne by the entrepreneur.

WTorre will hire a specialized company to manage the complex, passing onto Palmeiras an increasing percentage of the revenue with sponsorships, box seats and shows amongst others, starting on the first day of the complex's operation. At the end of this 30-year period, Palmeiras will integrate the whole enterprise, putting an end to the deal with company.

Partnerships 

On September 30, 2009, WTorre completed the partnership with Traffic Group for marketing properties of the arena, such as the naming rights, cabins, special chairs, restaurants, cafés and shops, among others. The sports media company will market the spaces used in sporting, musical, social and corporate events.

On October 6, 2011, Palmeiras and WTorre announced the agreement with Anschutz Entertainment Group (AEG), to manage events in the arena. In turn, AEG made a partnership with Blue Box Company, that will provide consulting services to the US company of the best services in the Brazilian territory.

On April 24, 2013, WTorre announced the naming rights agreement with the Allianz company, which holds the rights to name five other sporting arenas: the Allianz Arena in Germany, the Allianz Stadium in Australia; Allianz Park in England; Allianz Riviera, in France; and Allianz Stadion, under construction, in Austria. The agreement with the insurance company is valid for 20 years, with an option to renew for another 10 at the end of the period. The deal is estimated at R$300 million.

On April 29, 2013, Allianz announced three name options for the arena: Allianz Parque, Allianz Center and Allianz 360º. On June 6, 2013, with 89% of over 620 thousand votes registered on the official website of the enterprise, the name "Allianz Parque" was announced. The other two options had 7% and 4% of the votes, respectively.

On March 13, 2014, WTorre and AEG announced the agreement with the Gourmet Sports Hospitality company, belonging to Kofler & Kompanie (K&K) Group, from Germany. The agreement provides chef services on game days and buffets for corporate events, conferences, concerts and other events that occur on site. In the stadium there is a central kitchen of 1,500 m2 and ten support kitchens, three lounges and 46 cafeterias and kiosks to serve the public on game days and corporate events. Up to 500 people can work in these places in a day with maximum capacity. The company was also responsible for serving the public during the 2006 FIFA World Cup, in Germany, 2010 FIFA World Cup, in South Africa, 2013 FIFA Confederations Cup, in Brazil, 2014 Winter Olympics in Sochi, Russia, and some stages of Formula One. The company's contract with WTorre is valid for 20 years.

WTorre announced a partnership with Works Brazil Agency, a Works UK subsidiary, to perform the visual brand identity of the arena. In partnership with Allianz, the arena branding project was developed from its main logo. All communication elements associated with the brand "Allianz Parque", including banners, signboards, tickets, merchandising and other applications, were prepared for print and digital content. Similar projects have been developed by the company for corporations, national and international associations and international sports federations, such as IAAF, FIFA, FIVB, FIBA, FIH and NBA.

To organize events, from small conferences to large concerts, AEG hired Susan Darrington, former vice-president of the CenturyLink Field, largest stadium in Seattle, home field for the Seattle Seahawks and Seattle Sounders FC, for the position of general manager of the arena. Darrington will have primary responsibility for raising revenue for the Allianz Parque, with the initial goal of attracting about 300 events per year.

Inauguration 
The first official game at Allianz Parque was held on November 19, 2014, between Palmeiras and Sport Recife in the Brazilian Série A, when hosts Palmeiras lost to Sport Recife 0–2. The first official goal of the stadium was scored by Ananias.

Statistics

Reception

Palmeiras matches

Biggest attendances

Biggest grosses

International sporting events 

On June 7, 2015, the Arena hosted a friendly between Brazil and Mexico in order to prepare for the 2015 Copa América. The event was promoted by AEG Brazil in partnership with the British sports marketing agency Pitch International. The game ended 2–0 to Brazil, with goals from Philippe Coutinho and Diego Tardelli. It was the first game of the Brazilian team in the country since 2014 FIFA World Cup.

On August 8, 2015, the arena hosted the final of the League of Legends Brazilian Tournament, a Riot Games event. The winner competed with teams from Latin America and CIS for a place in the League of Legends World Championship. About 12,000 people attended the event, which was held in the amphitheater of the arena.

Musical events

International 
The very first big event at the Arena was on November 25 and 26, 2014, when Paul McCartney performed and completed his tour Out There in Brazil. About 50,000 people attended both concerts. The hard rock band Guns N' Roses performed at the stadium during their Not in This Lifetime...Tour on November 4 and 5, 2016 for an audience of 93,600 people. Shakira performed there during her El Dorado World Tour on October 21, 2018. The South Korean group BTS performed at the stadium during their Love Yourself: Speak Yourself Tour on May 25 and 26, 2019, with a sold-out crowd of 84,728 people.

National 
The first national concert at the Arena was performed by singer Roberto Carlos, on April 18, 2015, in commemoration of his 74th birthday. Over 50,000 people attended the presentation.

List of major concerts 

List of major concerts and musical events held at the Allianz Parque involving the full stadium and the amphitheater. Some concerts may have a different configuration, by using an increased amphitheater with the stage advancing a bit further into the pitch, and therefore, creating a greater space for the audience on the stands and on the pitch itself.

Other musical concerts 
On May 16, 2015, the arena hosted the edition of the "Arena Simpatia" event, with the presentation of the carioca band Samba de Santa Clara. The show also counted on the participation of the M.O.N. with Mario Velloso and Pietra Bertolazzi, The Juns, Jun Honda & Caio Ogura, besides the DJs Emiliano Beyrute, Gigga and Dre Guazelli.

On June 26, 2015, the arena hosted the event "Fextinha", 12 hours of open air non-stop music promoted by New Fun agency. With a capacity of up to 3,000 people, the party was led by DJs Make U Sweat, formed by Pedro Almeida, Dudu Linhares and Gustavo Guizeline, the Jetlag, with Thiago Mansur and Paulo Velloso, the duet M.O.N., with Mario Velloso and Pietra Bertolazzi, The Juns, with Jun Honda & Caio Jun, the Az Project of Ivan Arcuschin and Gabriel Salvia and also Emiliano Beyruthe and Marina Diniz.

On December 20, 2015, the Arena hosted the "All Colors Festival" for celebrating the 125 years of Allianz company. The festival featured various musical acts from 1 p.m. to 22 p.m., and part of the funds collected was donated to Instituto Ayrton Senna and Allianz Group's Employees' Benevolent Association (ABA).

Other events 

On December 18, 2014, the arena hosted the UFC Fight Night: Machida vs. Dollaway official training session, opened for fans and media and sponsored by the Ultimate Fighting Championship (UFC). In addition, Brazilian athletes Renan Barão, Antônio Carlos Júnior, Erick Silva and Elias Silverio attended the training, beyond the Canadian fighter Mitch Gagnon.

On January 25, 2015, just before the friendly match between Palmeiras and Red Bull Brasil, which Palmeiras won by 3–2, the arena hosted a freestyle motocross (FMX) show, a freestyle football presentation and a paraglider landing on the grass, among other actions promoted by both clubs. The Palmeiras former players Evair, Ademir da Guia and Rosemiro attended the event. After these presentations, there was the exhibition game in celebration of the 100 years since Palmeiras played their historical first game ever, when Palestra Italia (changed to Palmeiras after WWII) played against Sport Club Savoia on January 24, 1915, winning 2:0 and their first title, Savoia Cup.

On March 28, 2015, the arena hosted a friendly farewell match in honor of the former attacking midfielder Alex, who had a winning history at Palmeiras between the 1997 and 2000 seasons. With the presence of several players and club idols, the Palmeiras champion team, winner of the 1999 Copa Libertadores, won "Friends of Alex" by 5–3 with two goals from Alex.

On May 21, 2015, the arena hosted the Build Tour São Paulo, Brazilian stage of the annual Microsoft conference for developers of all Windows platforms. Among the speakers figured Pete Brown, Jeff Burtoft, Wael Rabadi and Matt Velloso, who presented details of Windows 10 development platform.

The 3rd Stadiums and Arenas Management Forum was held at the Arena on October 20, 2015. Organized by the companies Arenaplan Consulting and Brasil Sports Market, the meeting discussed the challenges and management strategies for small and large stadiums in Brazil. With a legacy of at least 14 new arenas after the 2014 FIFA World Cup, the management of these venues becomes an important goal to strive toward.

General features 

Allianz Parque has 43,713 covered seats, being 25,395 lower seats, 14,888 upper seats and 3,430 in the cabins. There are 188 private boxes from 12 to 21 seats, a panoramic restaurant, cafes, shops, convention center with modular structure for up to 1,500 visitors, media center for up to 1,000 media members, a multimedia memorial space with the history of the club and an adjacent covered parking for up to 2,000 cars, with exclusive spaces for motorcycles and bike rack. Multiple events such as shows and concerts, can receive up to 55,000 spectators.

Aiming to facilitate the goers movement, as well as cleaning the bleachers, chairs are not fixed to the floor, but on metal rails, the same model used in Wembley Stadium. In some sectors, the seats and backrests are upholstered with or without arms. The chairs are composed of three shades of green, giving rise to a geometric design inspired by arecaceae leaves.

The changing rooms have similar dimensions: a 355 m2 room to the home team, and a 270 m2 to the visiting team. The biggest has wooden cabinet with identification of athletes and a "community" cabinet to hold large numbers of objects. In the bathrooms there are two hot tubs and an individual one, for immersion.

The Allianz Parque complex comes with a Multisport Building, erected where once was located the old gym club. The new building has about 10 thousand square meters, spread over 4 floors and is served by three elevators. Downstairs, there is a gymnasium with seating for approximately 1,500 fans built to host basketball, futsal and volleyball games. Two intermediate floors with about 2 thousand square meters each other were designed to receive multisport activities. On the rooftop, there is a synthetic grass pitch for football practice, with an area of almost 2,000 meters to over 48 meters high. An unprecedented architectural solution in Brazil allows the visitors to enjoy the outside scenery, good ventilation and much natural light.

There is also a Multipurpose Building, designed based on the architectural concept developed by architect Tomás Taveira. It has approximately 13 thousand m2, spread over six floors plus ground floor. The building offers 8 changing rooms, 12 toilets and 6 elevators. The building facilities are for the use of club management, besides the indoor sports like judo and gymnastics; there is even a noble space on the top floor, which offers panoramic views of the club and the region.

The attractions of Allianz Parque are open to the general public. Access to club facilities, however, remains restricted to members of the Sociedade Esportiva Palmeiras.

Implementations 

On March 12, 2013, WTorre announced the acquisition of 64 high definition security cameras. The equipment, valued at R$15 million, is capable of performing face recognition of all visitors. The technology, which is used in high-traffic venues, such as airports in Europe and US, is able to immediately identify non-standard behaviors, i.e., fights and vandalism acts. The security software can archive images of faces to compare them later, even people using caps and goggles.

In early 2014, the WTorre announced the acquisition of two high-definition video screens to be installed inside the stadium. With costs estimated at R$7 million, the equipment has a  format, each with more than  area. The screens are installed at the ends of lawns, behind the goals, enabling the display of any content without the need for adaptation. The models feature white LED structure and shun conventional standards, with a resolution (16 mm) 20% higher compared to others. Thus, in all the seats of the stadium there is a good view of the images.

A solution developed by architect Edo Rocha, responsible for the arena project, was to coat the entire facade with drilled stainless steel that causes an optical art effect, with hollow spaces that resemble a wicker basket. The use of stainless steel ensures the best use of natural ventilation and lighting, in addition to functioning as a passive solar control element in order to moderate the temperature in the environment. The material is highly durable, low maintenance and cleaning, because it is washed in the rain. Furthermore, the use of that material aims to make outdoor advertising and serves to impact both visitors and pedestrians.

The arena roof is fully integrated into the facade, i.e., without the pillars, increasing the space for visitors. There are 33 meters vertically between the floor and the ceiling of the stadium, which protects 100% of the bleachers. Developed by Usiminas, a tubular metal frame and zipped thermo tiles provide the most pleasant sensations to the public, reducing the temperature by 2 °C between the level of the field and the upper seats and also the outside noises of the streets.

Around the playing field was installed a transparent polycarbonate cover to allow the maximum amount of sunlight to reach the ground. The Aviva Stadium in Dublin, and the Etihad Stadium in Manchester are some of the few in the world that use this technology.

Regarding environmental issues, the Allianz Parque has a system to capture rainwater that falls on the roof of the stadium, which has 23 thousand square meters. Thus, the collected water can be reused in different sectors of the arena, preventing stormwater is overloaded.

Accessibility 
According to the builder, in the arena there are 889 spaces for wheelchair users, 778 seats for the handicapped, 122 seats for obese, 63 accessible bathrooms distributed in all sectors: lower and upper stands and cabins. Furthermore, there are 15 elevators, 26 escalators, ramps and special box office. In the parking lot, there are forty-nine vacancies for people with special needs (PSN) located near to the elevators and 78 places for the elderly. Thus, the adjustments exceed the recommendations of the Brazilian standard and also FIFA.

In June 2017, the arena was the first in Brazil to be qualified by its architectural accessibility, receiving the "Selo guiaderodas" award, which evaluates premises and services for people with mobility issues. The qualification was based in analyses by specialized architects, practical tests by people with mobility issues and capacitation training for the staff of the stadium and the club.

Visibility 

The Allianz Parque has received much praise from the world's media, such as the Spanish site Elgoldigital.com, which considered it the most spectacular arena in the world, and the site Goal.com by Italian version, which defined it as the new contemporary architectural jewel of São Paulo.

On February 19, 2015, the Allianz Parque was named by popular vote the Stadium of The Year 2014. The leading competition was organized by Stadiony.net and StadiumDB.com, two websites dedicated to sports stadia. The competition was for venues opened in 2014, with Palmeiras stadium among 32 entries worldwide. Between January 17 and February 17, 2015, Allianz Parque got about 34,000 votes and 134,725 points. San Mamés Barria, in Spain, and Otkritie Arena, in Russia, have had 96,712 and 89,518 points each one and figured on second and third place, respectively. The renovated century-old Palestra Italia competed with seven other Brazilian arenas: Arena Corinthians, Arena da Amazônia, Arena da Baixada, Arena das Dunas, Arena Pantanal, Beira Rio and Estádio Kléber Andrade.

Popular culture 
To celebrate the opening of Allianz Parque, Allianz launched in December 2014 the mini-game Allianz Goal for Xbox Live, an online gaming service of Microsoft's Xbox consoles. The game content, designed in partnership with Ogilvy & Mather, a WPP company, aims to make football fans, especially young people, experience the brand of the Arena and interact with photos and information about this and five other arenas sponsored by Allianz around the world.

Awards 

On September 3, 2014, the architectural design of the arena received the Master Award at the 11th edition of the Grand Prix of Corporate Architecture, considered one of the most important architecture awards in Latin America. The arena also received the Sports Spotlight Award, category "Completed Work". The award was based on two evaluation criteria: architectural quality and benefits of the project for the region, noting various sectors of activity, such as health, education, sports, hotels, offices, etc.

On November 12, 2014, the construction of the arena was awarded in the category "Environmental Management at Works" at the 3rd Seconci Award for Occupational Safety and Health, organized by the São Paulo State Civil Construction Social Services (SECONCI-SP). Among the environmental management system implemented by the construction company, there were a waste management plan, erosion prevention measures, soil and water pollution control, water reuse and engineering control of noise levels. About 90% of all waste was reused or recycled, with 16 thousand cubic meters used in the work itself. The Palestra Italia stadium's old grass field was donated to the Mayor of the City of São Paulo to be reused in a town square.

Allianz Parque Tour 
On March 18, 2015, was inaugurated the "Allianz Parque Tour", which offers a guide service to the public with a trained Arena guide. In partnership with Futebol Tour company, the service offers a narrative journey through exclusive areas of the stadium, such as press boxes, cabins, convention center, press conference area, dressing rooms and field of play. The tour is available from Wednesday to Sunday (except on game days, other events or holidays) and lasts approximately one hour.

Controversies

Delays in opening 
Initially planned to be opened in late 2012, the Allianz Parque has suffered from delays due to bureaucracy and construction challenges. The first deadline for finalizing the works was in the first half of 2013, then for the second half of that year, for February of the following year, and finally for the second half of 2014, when the works were completed.

Accidents and alleged irregularities 
In April 2013, the collapse of three beams in the Arena works left one person dead and another injured. The accident happened where the new grandstand was built on the old structure of the Palestra Italia Stadium.

The beams collapse occurred at the same time in which the prosecution attempted to impound the works. The prosecutors questioned, besides the environmental degradation and traffic impacts, if the work was a renovation or a new construction, because the permit Palmeiras had since 2002 was for renovation, not demolition. It was precisely for this reason that the grandstands were not demolished, the same local where the worker died in 2013.

Discussion between Palmeiras and WTorre 
In February 2014, Palmeiras attempted to resolve an impasse with WTorre at the FGV Chamber of Conciliation and Arbitration. The main cause of disagreement between the club and the company is the division of seats in the Allianz Parque. WTorre claims to have the right to sell 100% of the seats, while Palmeiras claims that the contract set a maximum number of ten thousand seats to be sold by the builder. However, there is no discussion as to the amounts to be collected from the box office, which are 100% of the club, but today the marketing impasse to sell the seats is still being discussed.

See also

 Palestra Itália Stadium
 Pacaembu Stadium
 Morumbi Stadium
 Canindé Stadium
 Arena Corinthians

References

External links
 
 Palmeiras' official website
 Allianz Parque official website
 Allianz Parque project informations at WTorre official website
 International sports arenas sponsored by Allianz

Sociedade Esportiva Palmeiras
Football venues in São Paulo
Tourist attractions in São Paulo
Sports venues in São Paulo
Sports venues completed in 2014